Guitar World is a monthly music magazine for guitarists – and fans of guitar-based music and trends – that has been published since July 1980. Guitar World, the best-selling guitar magazine in the United States, contains original artist interviews and profiles, plus lessons/columns (with tablature and associated audio files or videos), gear reviews, news and exclusive tablature (for guitar and bass) of three songs per issue. The magazine is published 13 times per year (12 monthly issues and a holiday issue) by Future plc. Damian Fanelli has been Guitar World’s Editor-in-Chief since June 2018.

History 
Stanley Harris, a New York magazine publisher, launched Guitar World magazine in July 1980. The magazine’s debut issue featured bluesman Johnny Winter on the cover and included pieces on the Allman Brothers Band, George Thorogood and pedal steel guitars. As former Editor-in-Chief Brad Tolinski wrote in the magazine’s 40th-anniversary issue, "It was a decent start, but the design and editorial content was still a bit lackluster. If you compared it to an amp, GW’s first few issues were a sturdy 40-watt tweed combo, when what Harris really wanted was a row of 100-watt Marshalls."

Dennis Page, an advertising rep enlisted to handle the business end of the new magazine, hired a new Editor-in-Chief, Noe Goldwasser [aka Noe Gold]; Gold had his ear to the metal underground, printing the first of many cover stories with Eddie Van Halen. He edited several landmark issues in the magazine’s first decade, including GW'''s fifth anniversary issue in 1985, which featured a cover-to-cover celebration of Jimi Hendrix; and a July 1986 tribute to Led Zeppelin’s Jimmy Page, featuring a 15-page interview with the reclusive legend, along with early note-for-note transcriptions of Page solos to Stairway to Heaven and Rock and Roll.

When Gold left the magazine in 1988, he was replaced by Editor-in-Chief Joe Bosso and Executive Editor Matt Resnicoff. Due to their divergent tastes in music (Bosso preferred covering rock 'n' roll artists while Resnicoff was a jazz-fusion devotee), the magazine suffered from a split-personality approach to its coverage. As publisher Page said, "For a time the magazine lost its way. We started including a lot of jazz, which our readers didn’t care about. I knew the key was for us to get younger, not older."

That changed in 1989, when Tolinski was asked to step into the magazine’s lead role. "One glance at the May and June 1989 issues sums up the story," Tolinski wrote in 2020. "On one cover, a rather nervous-looking Allan Holdsworth hides timidly behind his Steinberger guitar, and on the next, Zakk Wylde explodes with pure animal fury while the headline screams SPECIAL REPORT! THE YOUNG GUNS OF METAL. GW went from black and white to full-on Technicolor."

After the June issue, GW became a straight-up rock 'n' roll magazine, becoming the publication Stanley Harris and Dennis Page dreamed of – a guitar magazine for "rockers with big hair, tight jeans and pointy guitars." And although rock, hard rock and heavy metal are still covered GW's pages, country guitarists, roots rockers, blues masters and shredders of all stripes have graced its pages, not to mention its cover.

Tolinski remained with the magazine until April 2015, when he was replaced by Jeff Kitts, who had been on GW's editorial staff since the early 1990s. Kitts was replaced by Damian Fanelli, who has been GW's editor-in-chief since June 2018; Fanelli had been with the magazine since 2011, originally as its online managing editor, later becoming its managing editor.

 Publishing history and sister magazines Guitar World’s debut issue was only 82 pages, had a very small staff and budget and wasn’t even on a monthly schedule for about the first 12 years of publication. By 1984, GW began to multiply – spinoffs and offshoots became a large part of its focus as ownership looked to expand its reach into other markets and demographics. That year saw the publication of Guitar Heroes, a one-shot guide to more than 100 of the greatest guitar players of all time. In early 1992, the idea was revived as the semiannual Guitar World Legends, but with one major change: each issue was conceived as a tribute to an artist or genre, and included past GW interviews, lessons, equipment guides, rare photos and more.

GW’s first official sister publication was Guitar School, which debuted in 1989 and foundered in 1997 shortly after its name was changed to Maximum Guitar. In the summer of 1993 GW branched out with Country Guitar, which morphed into Guitar World Acoustic and lasted until 2007. Mid-2003 saw GW venturing into the bass market with the premiere of Guitar World’s Bass Guitar, which eventually ceased operation with its Pete Wentz-fronted June 2007 issue.

In the summer of 2009, GW’s editorial staff launched Guitar Aficionado, a high-end publication designed for players passionate about the finer things associated with the rock ’n’ roll lifestyle, including vintage and collectible axes, designer watches and fashion, exotic motorcycles, fine foods and spirits and more. By 2017, Guitar Aficionado had run its course.Revolver, one of the leading hard rock and metal publications still in existence, was conceived as GW’s sister publication in 1999. When it hit newsstands in the spring of 2000, Revolver’s debut issue contained a unique mix of content, including an oral history of the Doors, a behind-the-scenes look at the Japanese pop scene and members of Slipknot wearing fashionable men’s suits. But perhaps the world wasn’t quite ready for such an eclectic combo: after only a few issues, Revolver was retooled and relaunched into the magazine metal fans know today.

While each of these magazines has either been killed off or – in the case of Revolver – sold to another company, GW is still part of a large family. As a member of Future plc, it calls Guitar Techniques, Total Guitar, Guitarist, Guitar Player and Bass Player its sister publications.GW was published by Harris Publications from 1980 to 2003 and by Future US from 2003 to 2012. NewBay Media took over from 2012 to 2018, until Future plc re-acquired the magazine in April 2018.

 Key editorial personnel 

 Editor-in-Chief – Damian Fanelli
 Senior Music Editor – Jimmy Brown
 Tech Editor – Paul Riario
 Associate Editors – Andy Aledort, Chris Gill
 Art Director – Mixie von Bormann

 GuitarWorld.com GuitarWorld.com was first launched in 1994 as the online counterpart to Guitar World magazine. It is run by a separate team to the print publication and posts up-to-the-minute guitar news, features, interviews, lessons, reviews and buyer’s guides, as well as select content from the magazine. The site reaches 3.3m users per month. Since 2020, it has become the online home of other Future guitar brands, including UK titles Guitarist, Total Guitar, Guitar Techniques and US title Bass Player, all of which were formerly hosted on GuitarWorld.com sister site MusicRadar. Australian Guitar is also part of the GuitarWorld.com portfolio of brands.

During Guitar World’s NewBay Media era, the site was edited by Damian Fanelli, who is now the print magazine’s Editor-in-Chief. Since 2019, GuitarWorld.com’s Editor-in-Chief is former MusicRadar'' Guitars Editor Michael Astley-Brown.

Personnel 

 Editor-in-Chief – Michael Astley-Brown
 Associate Editor – Jackson Maxwell
 Staff Writers – Sam Roche, Matt Owen

References

External links
Guitar World website

Monthly magazines published in the United States
Music magazines published in the United States
Guitar magazines
Magazines established in 1980
Magazines published in New York City